Firbeck Main F.C. was an English association football club based in Langold, Nottinghamshire.

History
The club played in the local Worksop leagues during the Second World War and joined the Yorkshire League after hostilities ended. Their spell in this competition lasted just a single season.

League and cup history

Records
Best FA Cup performance: 1st Qualifying Round, 1945–46, 1948–49

References

Yorkshire Football League
Mining association football teams in England
Defunct football clubs in Nottinghamshire